Joan Winifred Cribb  (née Herbert; born 1930) is an Australian botanist and mycologist.

She was born in Brisbane, Queensland, the daughter of botanists Vera and Desmond Herbert. She graduated from the University of Queensland with a Bachelor of Science with Honours and a Master of Science. She married fellow botanist Alan Cribb in 1954, and several years later joined him at the University of Queensland as a part-time lecturer and tutor.

Cribb specialised in gasteroid fungi, describing twenty-one new species in that group, as well as fourteen new species of marine fungi. For over 45 years Joan Cribb travelled over Queensland discovering and recording gasteromycetes. She and her husband also investigated algae-inhabiting fungi found in marine habitats and have recorded occurrences of freshwater fungi in Queensland waterways.

Cribb was awarded the Australian Natural History Medallion in 1994. In the 2020 Australia Day Honours she was awarded the Medal of the Order of Australia for "service to higher education as a botanist, and to the community".

The secotioid fungi genus Cribbea was named after her. Fungus species named after her include Hymenogaster cribbiae and Stephanospora cribbae.

References

1930 births
Living people
20th-century Australian botanists
Australian mycologists
University of Queensland alumni
Academic staff of the University of Queensland
Recipients of the Medal of the Order of Australia
20th-century Australian women scientists